The Phantom of the Opera is a 1962 British horror film directed by Terence Fisher, a loose adaptation of the 1910 novel Le Fantôme de l'Opéra by Gaston Leroux. The film was made by Hammer Film Productions but performed unsuccessfully at the box office.

Plot
In 1900, at the first night of the season at the London Opera House, a new opera by Lord Ambrose D'Arcy opens. D'Arcy, a wealthy and pompous man, is annoyed and scornful when the manager Lattimer informs him the theatre has not been completely sold out. No one will sit in Box #5, as it is believed to be haunted.
Backstage, despite the soothing efforts of the producer, Harry Hunter, everyone, including the show's star, Maria, is nervous and upset as if a sinister force was at work. When the body of a murdered stagehand swings out of the wings during Maria's first aria, pandemonium ensues.

With the show postponed and Maria refusing to perform again, Harry frantically auditions new singers. He finds a promising young star in Christine Charles, one of the chorus girls. Lord Ambrose lecherously approves of the selection and invites Christine to dinner. In her dressing room, Christine is warned against Lord Ambrose by a Phantom voice. That night, Lord Ambrose attempts to seduce her, but as they are about to leave for his apartment, Harry saves her. On the ride back home, Christine tells Harry about the voice she heard.

Intrigued, Harry takes Christine back to the opera house, where in her dressing room, the same voice tells Harry to leave her there and go. At the same time, the rat-catcher is murdered by the Phantom's lackey, a dwarf. Investigating the murder, Harry leaves Christine by herself, where she is approached by a man dressed in black, wearing a mask with only one eye, The Phantom of the Opera. He tells her she must come with him, but she screams, and The Phantom flees. Harry comforts her and takes her home.

The next day Lord Ambrose sends a dismissal to Christine for refusing to come back to his apartment. Lord Ambrose chooses a more willing but less talented singer to take Christine's place. When Harry refuses to accept this, he is also dismissed by Lord Ambrose. Visiting Christine at her boarding house, Harry finds some old manuscripts that he recognizes as a rough draft of the opera he has produced. Questioning Christine's landlady Mrs. Tucker, he learns that it was written by a former boarder named Professor Petrie, who had been killed in a fire at a printing press that was to print his music. Making further inquiries, he learns that Petrie did not actually perish in the fire, but was splashed with Nitric Acid while apparently trying to extinguish the blaze, had run away in agony and was drowned in the River Thames. This is confirmed by the policeman who was in the area at the time, but the body was never recovered. Harry and Christine have a romantic day together. While having a moonlight carriage ride, Harry tells her about Petrie, and that he is convinced that Lord Ambrose stole Petrie's music. He leaves it at that, as he believes that the Professor is long since dead.

When Christine gets home, she is confronted by the dwarf and faints from fright and is carried off. When she wakes, she is in the Phantom's lair deep in the cellars of the opera house, and the Phantom is playing a huge organ. He tells the frightened girl that he will teach her to sing properly and rehearses her with fanatical insistence until she collapses from exhaustion. Meanwhile, Harry, reinstated as the opera producer, is worried about Christine's disappearance. Pondering the story of the mysterious Professor, he checks the river where he had last been seen. At that same moment, he hears the echo of Christine's voice emanating from a storm drain and soon finds himself following the voice through one of London's water-filled sewers. The faint sound of the organ playing draws him down a tunnel where the dwarf attacks him with a knife. Harry subdues him and finds himself facing the missing Professor as Christine looks on from a bed (where she'd been sleeping).

Harry asks the professor what had happened in his past. In a flashback, the Phantom says that five years before, as a poor and starving composer, he had been forced to sell all of his music, including the opera, to Lord Ambrose for a pitifully small fee with the thought that his being published would bring him recognition. When he discovered that Lord Ambrose was having the music published under his own name, Petrie became enraged and broke into the printers to destroy the plates. While burning the music that had already been printed, Petrie unwittingly started a fire, then accidentally splashed acid on his face and hands in an effort to put it out, thinking it was water. In terrible agony, he ran out, jumped into the river, and was swept by the current into an underground drain, where he was rescued and cared for by the dwarf. The Phantom says that he is dying, but he wishes to see his opera performed by Christine. They both agree to allow him time to complete her voice coaching.
 
Several weeks later, on the eve of a performance of "Saint Joan," the Phantom confronts Lord Ambrose in his office. He rips off The Phantom's mask and runs out screaming into the night after seeing his terrifying face. The Phantom then watches Christine sing from the "haunted" box. Her performance brings him to tears as he hears his music finally presented. Listening enraptured to the music, the dwarf is discovered in the catwalks by a stage-hand, and in the chase, he jumps onto a huge chandelier poised high above the stage over Christine. As the rope begins to break from the weight, the Phantom spots the danger. He rips off his mask, leaps from his box to the stage, and pushes Christine safely from harm. The chandelier impales him before the eyes of the horror-stricken audience.

Cast
 Herbert Lom as The Phantom of the Opera/Professor Petrie
 Heather Sears as Christine Charles
 Edward de Souza as Harry Hunter
 Michael Gough as Lord Ambrose D'Arcy
 Ian Wilson as The Dwarf
 Thorley Walters as Lattimer
 Harold Goodwin as Bill
 Marne Maitland as Xavier
 Miriam Karlin as Charwoman
 Patrick Troughton as The Rat Catcher
 Renée Houston as Mrs. Tucker
 Keith Pyott as Weaver
 Ivor Evans as opera singer (uncredited) - his voice was overdubbed
Patricia Clark provided the dubbed-over soprano voice for Heather Sears.

Production
Based upon the interest generated by the Phantom of the Opera sequence in the Lon Chaney biopic Man of a Thousand Faces, and the success of the 1943 remake, Universal was interested in revisiting the story again.  The first plans for remake were in-studio, with William Alland producing and Franklin Coen writing. Plans for this remake fell through, but upon the success of the distribution of Dracula for Hammer, Universal decided to let the British outfit tackle the project instead and announced the project in February, 1959.

Two months later, Hammer Pictures struck a five-year deal with Columbia Pictures to produce five films a year.  On these terms, Hammer's previous arrangements (such as The Mummy for Universal Studios and The Hound of the Baskervilles for United Artists) could be fulfilled, but thereafter could produce only two pictures a year for other studios.  Phantom of the Opera was among those announced for Universal.

Over the next two years, the project fell on and off the charts.  In 1960, the project was connected with Kathryn Grayson, although she had not been in pictures for some years. According to author Wayne Kinsey's interpretation of a quote from producer Anthony Hinds, the romantic lead (Harry Hunter) was written for Cary Grant . Grant had expressed his interest in doing a Hammer horror film, at a time when it was common for American actors to be featured in British films. Actually, what Hinds said repeatedly in interviews was, "I wrote the script for Cary Grant," which makes it far more likely Grant was to play the title role, not a subordinate leading man.

Production for the film started in November 1961. As with most of the Hammer productions, the film was shot at Bray Studios on a modest budget. Lom recalled in one interview how the producers at Hammer expected actors to throw themselves into their work: "For one of my scenes, the Hammer people wanted me to smash my head against a stone pillar, because they said they couldn't afford one made of rubber," Lom reveals. "I refused to beat my head against stone, of course. This caused a 'big crisis', because it took them half a day to make a rubber pillar that looked like stone. And of course, it cost a few pennies more. Horror indeed!"

Many of the exterior sets utilised were on the studio's backlot and had already been used for many Hammer productions previously. Interiors of the "London Opera House" were filmed at the Wimbledon Theatre in London, which was rented for three weeks.  Over 100 musicians and chorus people were hired for the shoot. The film had a reported budget initially of £200,000, but it was reported after principal shooting to be £400,000, both figures unusually high for a Hammer film.

All of the flashback scenes showing how Professor Petrie became the Phantom were filmed with "Dutch angles," meaning the camera was noticeably tilted to give an unreal, off-kilter effect: a time-honored method in film of representing either a flashback or a dream.

The Phantom of the Opera opened in New York City on 22 August 1962 at the RKO Palace Theater. In person was Sonya Cordeau, who played "Yvonne" in the picture.  Cordeau later went on tour with the film for Universal.

When the film had its American TV premiere on NBC, additional footage of Scotland Yard police inspectors (played by Liam Redmond and John Maddison) looking for the Phantom was filmed to increase the running time. This footage was shot at Universal Studios, and Hammer Productions had no input at all. Kiss of the Vampire and The Evil of Frankenstein also had American-shot footage added to their television showings. This was a common practice when it was thought that parts of the film were "too intense." These scenes were edited out, and more acceptable scenes replaced them to extend the running time.

In common with Hammer's usual practice, when shown in British cinemas in 1962, the film was paired with Captain Clegg, another of the studio's films.

Music
The music in this movie features Johann Sebastian Bach's Toccata and Fugue in D minor, arguably the most famous piece of organ music ever composed, and one that has become commonly associated with horror films. The trailer uses stock music from Revenge of the Creature due to both of them being released by Universal.

Critical reception 
The Monthly Film Bulletin wrote: "The absurd, much-filmed story crumbles—at any rate here—once the ingénue is reconciled to The Phantom as her mentor; but its Gothic elements are rich enough to defy time ... Surprisingly tasteful for a Hammer film, the production is also quite imaginative (The Phantom's rocky, water-lapped lair, complete with organ and double-bed) and careful." Howard Thompson of The New York Times called the film "a real disappointment ... In the hands of the British, with Herbert Lom as the opera ogre, the result is ornate and pretty dull. Whatever happened, chaps?" Variety wrote that the film "still provides a fair measure of goose pimples to combat some potential unwanted yocks. In the shadow of its predecessors the current 'Phantom' seems a reasonable booking for average houses, without doing anything to erase oldtimers' memories of the earlier versions." Harrison's Reports gave the film a grade of "Fair", writing, "The story of creative fakery, revenge and danger is not only loosely woven together, but its believability is weak. Its dénouement is thin and vaporish."

The Hammer Story: The Authorised History of Hammer Films wrote of the film: "Although distinguished by some fine acting, sets and music, The Phantom of the Opera seems decidedly half-baked." The author(s) called Terence Fisher's direction "misguided", and noted that distributor J. Arthur Rank Film Distributors' "emasculation of the British print sealed its fate." The film also takes away much of the Phantom's dark, morbid side, making him a tragic hero.

Home video release
The film was first released to VHS by Universal's MCA Home Video in 1995.

In North America, the film was released on 6 September 2005 along with seven other Hammer horror films on the 4-DVD set The Hammer Horror Series (ASIN: B0009X770O), which is part of MCA-Universal's Franchise Collection. This set was re-released on Blu-ray on 13 September 2016.

In the UK, Final Cut Entertainment released the film on Blu-Ray in 2014. Powerhouse Films re-released the film on Blu-Ray in the UK in 2021, along with The Shadow of the Cat, Captain Clegg, and Nightmare as part of Hammer Volume Six: Night Shadows.

References

Sources

External links

 
 
 
 

1962 horror films
1962 films
Films about composers
Films about opera
Films based on horror novels
Films based on The Phantom of the Opera
Films directed by Terence Fisher
Films set in London
Films shot at Bray Studios
Hammer Film Productions horror films
Films set in the Victorian era
Gothic horror films
1960s monster movies
Universal Pictures films
British monster movies
1960s English-language films
1960s British films